Juventud Ticlacayán is a Peruvian football club, playing in the city of Cerro de Pasco.

The club were founded 27 March 2011 and play in the Copa Perú which is the third division of the Peruvian league.

History
In the 2011 Copa Perú, the club classified to the Regional Stage, but was eliminated by ADT.

In the 2012 Copa Perú, the club classified to the National Stage, but was eliminated by Defensor Zarumilla.

Notable players

Honours

National
Región V: 1
Winners (1): 2012

Liga Departamental de Pasco: 1
Winners (1): 2011
Runner-up (1): 2012

Liga Provincial de Pasco: 1
Runner-up (1): 2011

Liga Distrital de Cerro de Pasco: 1
Winners (1): 2011

See also
List of football clubs in Peru
Peruvian football league system

References

Football clubs in Peru
Association football clubs established in 2011